Sylvia Weve (born 28 May 1954) is a Dutch illustrator.

Weve has illustrated over 150 books and she has received numerous awards for her work, including the Gouden Penseel award, the Woutertje Pieterse Prijs and the Max Velthuijs-prijs.

Career 

In 1983, Weve made her debut as children's book illustrator by illustrating the book Een noom op school written by Corrie Hafkamp. Early in her career, Weve illustrated many books by Rindert Kromhout. Weve went on to illustrate many books by numerous authors including Karel Eykman, Veronica Hazelhoff, Ted van Lieshout, Bies van Ede and Edward van de Vendel. In 2006, she published Kip en ei, a book which she both wrote and illustrated herself.

Later in her career she started collaborating with Bette Westera and they both won various awards for their work, including the Woutertje Pieterse Prijs in 2015. They also won this award in 2020 for their book Uit elkaar.

In 2019, she won the prestigious Max Velthuijs-prijs for her entire oeuvre.

Weve also created illustrations for children's magazines including Okki, Taptoe, Jippo, Ezelsoor and St. Kitts van de Bovenwindse. Weve's work can also be found in magazines and newspapers such as Viva, Elsevier, Opzij, NRC Handelsblad and De Volkskrant.

Awards 

 1983: Vlag en Wimpel, Wie verliefd is gaat voor (written by Karel Eykman)
 1984: Zilveren Penseel, Oma, waar blijft de taart? (written by Veronica Hazelhoff)
 1990: Vlag en Wimpel, Lastige portretten (written by Karel Eykman)
 1991: Zilveren Penseel, Het bad van de zandloper (written by Rindert Kromhout)
 1998: Vlag en Wimpel, Magische tekens
 2007: Vlag en Wimpel, Kip en ei
 2013: Gouden Penseel, Aan de kant, ik ben je oma niet! (written by Bette Westera)
 2013: Vlag en Wimpel, Aan de kant, ik ben je oma niet! (written by Bette Westera)
 2013: Vlag en Wimpel, Dat zou ik nooit doen! (written by Bette Westera and Naomi Tieman)
 2015: Vlag en Wimpel,  Doodgewoon (with Bette Westera)
 2015: Woutertje Pieterse Prijs, Doodgewoon (with Bette Westera)
 2019: Max Velthuijs-prijs, entire oeuvre
 2020: Woutertje Pieterse Prijs, Uit elkaar (with Bette Westera)

References

External links 

 
 Sylvia Weve, Nederlands Letterenfonds
 Sylvia Weve (in Dutch), Digital Library for Dutch Literature
 Sylvia Weve (in Dutch), jeugdliteratuur.org

1954 births
Living people
Dutch children's book illustrators
Woutertje Pieterse Prize winners
Max Velthuijs Prize winners
Dutch women illustrators
Dutch illustrators
Gouden Penseel winners